Charles Elliott (22 September 1811 – 5 July 1876) was a New Zealand politician and newspaper proprietor.

Commercial career
Elliott was born in Barnstaple in North Devon in 1811. He and his brother James came to New Zealand on the Mary Jane; the ship left the West India Docks in London in September 1841 and arrived in Nelson Harbour on 10 February 1842. Having brought a printing press with him, Elliott established The Nelson Examiner and New Zealand Chronicle in 1842; this was the first newspaper in the South Island. In August 1842, he opened a bookshop in Nelson, one of the first in New Zealand. He held a sheep station in the Awatere Valley. He was particularly interested in horse racing and wrote for other publications under the pen name "Cheval". He published texts written by the suffragist Mary Müller, to whom he was related through marriage, in his newspaper.

Political career
Elliott was elected to the first Nelson Provincial Council for the Wairau electorate and held the post from 10 August 1853 to 1 August 1857, and represented the electorate in the second council from 9 October 1857 to 18 October 1859. He then represented the Amuri electorate from 7 April 1860 to 29 November 1861. He lastly represented the Nelson electorate from 23 February 1863 to 27 March 1865. In parallel, he represented the Awatere electorate in the Marlborough Provincial Council from 16 April 1860 to 16 October 1861.

On 5 November 1855, Elliott—alongside William Travers—was elected unopposed to represent the Waimea electorate in the 2nd New Zealand Parliament. Elliott resigned before the end of his term on 20 March 1858.

Later life
Elliott's newspaper had to be shut down in 1874. He subsequently took on the role of immigration officer for Nelson Province. He died on 5 July 1876 in Nelson from a stroke. Elliott Street, and the Elliott Street heritage precinct (which also comprises parts of Trafalgar and Collingwood streets) was named after him.

Notes

References
 
 
 

1811 births
1876 deaths
Businesspeople from Barnstaple
People from Nelson, New Zealand
New Zealand MPs for South Island electorates
Members of the Nelson Provincial Council
Members of the Marlborough Provincial Council
Members of the New Zealand House of Representatives
New Zealand editors
New Zealand magazine editors